Ajjabasavanahalli  is a village in the southern state of Karnataka, India. It is located in the Kanakapura taluk of Ramanagaram district.

See also
 Districts of Karnataka

References

Villages in Ramanagara district